Mandie Elizabeth Fletcher (born 27 December 1954) is a British television and film director.

Fletcher began her career at the BBC as an assistant floor manager and later production manager on comedy programmes, becoming a director of situation comedy while working on the final series of Butterflies (1983). She followed this with the second (1986) and third (1987) series of Blackadder, for which she won the Best Comedy Series award at the 1988 BAFTAs. She also directed episodes of Only Fools and Horses (1986).

Her debut feature was Deadly Advice (1994). Fletcher has continued to work in television with Hamish Macbeth (1996–1997) and Jam and Jerusalem (2006–2009).  Most recently she directed the critically acclaimed BBC 2 series Roger & Val Have Just Got In, which was broadcast in Spring 2012, and starred Dawn French and Alfred Molina.  She also directed the latest episodes of Absolutely Fabulous including the Olympic special. In 2013, she directed the pilot episode of In and Out of the Kitchen. In 2016, Fletcher directed Absolutely Fabulous: The Movie.

Filmography

Film
 Deadly Advice (1994)
 Absolutely Fabulous: The Movie (2016)
 Patrick (2018)

References

External links

1954 births
BBC people
British television directors
British television producers
British women television producers
English-language film directors
Living people
British film directors
British women television directors